Basketball was one of the many sports which was held at the 2002 Asian Games in Busan, South Korea between 28 September and 14 October 2002. The competition took place at Geumjeong Gymnasium.

Schedule

Medalists

Medal table

Draw
The teams were seeded based on their final ranking at the 1998 Asian Games.

Men

Group A
 (1)
 (11)
*

Group B
 (2)
 (10)
*

Group C
 (3)
 (8)
*

Group D
 (4)
 (5)

* Lebanon and India withdrew, India was replaced by North Korea and Kuwait moved to Group A to balance the number of teams in each group.

Women

Group A
 (1)
 (4)
*
*

Group B
 (2)
 (3)

* Lebanon and India withdrew, The remaining teams played in a round-robin competition.

Final standing

Men

Women

References
Results Men
Results Women

External links
Official website

 
Basketball
2002
2002–03 in Asian basketball
International basketball competitions hosted by South Korea